Hazel's Wreath is the second album by folk rock band Tiny Lights, released in 1988 through Gaia Records.

Release and reception 

Although it was not as warmly received as its predecessor has been, Hazel's Wreath still garnered favorable reviews. Critics of the Trouser Press said despite its shortcomings the records "a solid mix of solemnity and abandon"

Track listing

Personnel 

Tiny Lights
 Donna Croughn – vocals, violin
 Andy Demos – drums, tabla, soprano saxophone
 Dave Dreiwitz – bass guitar, trumpet, vocals
 John Hamilton – guitar, sitar, mandolin, vocals, production
 Jane Scarpantoni – cello

Additional musicians and production
 Laura Demos – flute on "Around It Goes Around"
 Barbara Dreiwitz – tuba on "Colors and the Light"
 Dick Dreiwitz – trombone on "Colors and the Light"
 Henry Hirsch – piano on "Grown-up Fish"
 Jack Petruzzelli – mellotron on "Red Planet"

External links

References 

1988 albums
Tiny Lights albums